Castlereagh is a barony in County Roscommon, Ireland. It is named after the town of Castlerea within the barony.

It contains five civil parishes: Ballintober, Baslick, Kilkeevin, Kilcorkey, and Kiltullagh; including the towns of Ballinlough, Bellanagare, Castlerea, and Cloonfad.

History
Castlereagh barony was anciently part of the territory of the Síol Maelruain, ruled by the Flynn (Ó Floinn) family, whose name survive in the large lake in the barony, Lough O'Flynn.

From the 18th century onward the Wills and Sandford families were the main landlords (see: Baron Mount Sandford).

List of settlements

Below is a list of settlements in Castlereagh barony:
Ballinlough
Ballintober
Bellanagare
Castleplunket
Castlerea
Cloonfad

References

Baronies of County Roscommon